is the traditional name of the month of August in the Japanese calendar and a Japanese surname and given name. It can also refer to:

People with given name
, Japanese diver
, Japanese professional footballer
, Japanese field hockey player
, Japanese field hockey player
, vocalist for the band Lynch
, Japanese wrestler

People with surname
, Japanese actress
, Japanese voice actress
, Japanese actress
, a Japanese women's professional wrestler
, Japanese actress

Fictional characters
, the father Ryo Hazuki in the video game series Shenmue
, a character from the anime Free!
, a character from the anime Love Live! Superstar!!
, the protagonist in the video game series, Shenmue
, a character from the manga New Game!
Hazuki Shiina, a character in the anime and manga series Legend of Light
, a character in Ojamajo Doremi
, a character from the anime Tsukuyomi -Moon Phase-
, a character from the anime and eroge Yami to Bōshi to Hon no Tabibito
, a character from the visual novel 999: Nine Hours, Nine Persons, Nine Doors, whose code name was "Lotus"
, a character from the Japanese light novel series Baka and Test

See also
The eighth month of the Japanese calendar

Japanese-language surnames
Japanese unisex given names